The 35th century BC in the Near East sees the gradual transition from the Chalcolithic to the Early Bronze Age. Proto-writing enters transitional stage, developing towards writing proper. Wheeled vehicles are now known beyond Mesopotamia, having spread north of the Caucasus and to Europe.

Cultures

 Susa (Iran since 7000 BC)
 Uruk period (Sumer)
 Naqada IIb (Ancient Egypt)
 Early Minoan I
 Sredny Stog culture (final phase)
 Yamna culture (early phase)
 Cucuteni culture
 Vinča culture
 Megalithic Europe (Atlantic fringe)
 Nuragic civilization (Sardinia)
 Comb Ceramic culture
 Funnelbeaker culture
 Yangshao culture

Artifacts
Only approximate dating is usually possible for mid-4th millennium artifacts.
Kish tablet
Bronocice pot
Ginger (mummy)
Knap of Howar

Events

The Sahara desert starts to form from semi-arid savannah, through desertification.
c. 3500 BC: First known zoo at Hierakonpolis.
c. 3400 BC: Sumerian temple record keepers redesign the stamp seal in the form of a cylinder.
c. 3500 BC: Pictographic proto-writing starts developing towards writing proper in Sumer, thus starting what is technically considered history.
 c. 3500 BC: The first monument of which there is still a trace is built on the Hill of Tara, the ancient seat of the High King of Ireland.
c. 3500 BC: Tin is discovered.
c. 3500 BC: The Eruption of Mount Isarog in the Philippines.
c. 3500 BC: The Sumerians develop a logographic script, cuneiform

Sovereign states

References

 

-5
-65